Khokling     is a village development committee in the Himalayas of Taplejung District in the Province No. 1 of north-eastern Nepal. At the time of the 2011 Nepal census it had a population of 3,376 people living in 693 individual households. There were 1,614 males and 1,762 females at the time of census.

References

External links
UN map of the municipalities of Taplejung District

Populated places in Taplejung District